Allocasuarina rupicola, commonly known as shrubby she-oak, is a species of the genus Allocasuarina native to Australia.

It is found among clefts in granite near creeks in north eastern New South Wales and south eastern Queensland.

References

External links
  Occurrence data for Allocasuarina rupicola from The Australasian Virtual Herbarium

rupicola
Fagales of Australia
Flora of New South Wales
Flora of Queensland
Dioecious plants